Chelaseius is a genus of mites in the Phytoseiidae family.

Species
 Chelaseius arnei Faraji & Karg, 2006
 Chelaseius austrellus (Athias-Henriot, 1967) 
 Chelaseius brazilensis Denmark & Kolodochka, 1990 
 Chelaseius caudatus Karg, 1983 
 Chelaseius floridanus (Muma, 1955) 
 Chelaseius freni Karg, 1976 
 Chelaseius lativentris Karg, 1983 
 Chelaseius schusterellus (Athias-Henriot, 1967) 
 Chelaseius tundra (Chant & Hansell, 1971) 
 Chelaseius valliculosus Kolodochka, 1987 
 Chelaseius vicinus (Muma, 1965)

References

Phytoseiidae
Acari genera